Ganjoni is a neighbourhood of Mombasa, Kenya, located on Mombasa Island. It had a population of 18, 791 in 1999.

It is divided between in the Kisauni and Likoni electoral constituencies.

External links
Wikimapia

Populated places in Coast Province
Mombasa